Topia is a city and seat of the municipality of Topia, in the state of Durango, north-western Mexico.  As of 2010, the town of Topia had a population of 2,051.

Climate

References

Populated places in Durango